Modern Art is the fourth studio album by Italian singer-songwriter Nina Zilli. It was released in Italy on 1 September 2017 through Universal Music. The album peaked at number 17 on the Italian Albums Chart.

Singles
"Mi hai fatto fare tardi" was released as the lead single from the album on 26 May 2017. "Domani arriverà (Modern Art)" was released as the second single from the album on 29 September 2017. "Senza appartenere" was released as the third single from the album on 6 February 2018. The song peaked at number 74 on the Italian Singles Chart. The song was Zilli's entry for the Sanremo Music Festival 2018, the 68th edition of Italy's musical festival which doubles also as a selection of the act for Eurovision Song Contest. "1xUnattimo" was released as the fourth single from the album on 16 March 2018. "Ti amo mi uccidi" was released as the fifth single from the album on 22 June 2018.

Track listing
Credits adapted from Tidal.

Charts

Release history

References

2017 albums
Nina Zilli albums